Eileen Cooper  (born 10 June 1953) is a British artist, known primarily as a painter and printmaker.

Early life 
Cooper was born in Glossop, Derbyshire and attended Ashton-under-Lyne College of Further Education. She went on to study at Goldsmiths College (1971-1974) and the Royal College of Art (1974-1977) gaining an MA in painting.

Career 
Between 1977 and 2000 she was visiting lecturer at arts schools across the UK including Falmouth School of Art, Leicester College of Art & Design, St Martin’s School of Art, Camberwell College of Arts, and City & Guilds of London Art School.  She lectured on Printmaking at the Royal College of Art between 1994 and 2006 and became Head of Printmaking at the Royal Academy Schools in 2005 until 2010.

She was elected a Royal Academician in 2001.  From 2010 to 2017, Cooper served as Keeper of the Royal Academy, one of only 4 officers selected from the 80 Royal Academicians, and with primary responsibility for the Royal Academy Schools, thereby becoming the first woman to be elected to this role in the Royal Academy's 250-year history.

In 2017, Cooper curated and co-ordinated the Royal Academy of Arts' 249th annual Summer Exhibition. 

After ending her teaching role at the Royal Academy Schools in 2017 Cooper returned to drawing from life and portraiture in particular. Two of the works from this series (one of fellow Royal Academician Cathie Pilkington and the other a self-portrait) were acquired by the National Portrait Gallery.

Selected solo exhibitions 
 2019   Personal Space, Huxley-Parlour Gallery, London
 2018   Under the Same Moon, Letitia Gallery, Beirut, Lebanon
 2017   Till the Morning Comes, The Fine Art Society, London
 2017   Eileen Cooper: A Woman's Skin, Wolfson College, University of Cambridge
 2016   Between the Lines, Galerie MIRO, Prague, Czech Republic
 2015   Hide and Seek: Work on Paper 1977-2014, Royal Academy of Arts, London (touring to Swindon Museum and Art Gallery; The Mercer Art Gallery, Harrogate)
 2015   In the Garden, Rabley Drawing Centre, Marlborough, Wiltshire
 2013   Edge to Edge, Art First, London
 2012   South Lookout Project, Aldeburgh Beach, Suffolk
 2010   Collages, Royal Academy of Arts, London
 2008   Taking Stock: The Printmaking of Eileen Cooper RA, Clifford Chance, London and Liverpool Hope University
 2000   Raw Material: Eileen Cooper at Dulwich Picture Gallery, Dulwich Picture Gallery, London
 1999   Second Skin: Eileen Cooper in the 80s and 90s travelling exhibition (Wolverhampton, Nottingham, Eastbourne)
 1994   Eileen Cooper at Sadlers Wells, Sadlers Wells Theatre, London
 1992   Drawings, Benjamin Rhodes Gallery, London
 1986   Castlefield Gallery, Manchester
 1979   AIR Gallery, London

Selected group exhibitions 

 1997-2018  Regular exhibitor at Summer Exhibition, Royal Academy of Arts, London
 2018   Sawdust and Sequins: The Art of the Circus, Royal West of England Academy, Bristol
 2016   Towards Night, curated by Tom Hammick, Towner Art Gallery, Eastbourne
 2015   She Came to Stay, curated by Aretha Campbell and Lucy Farley, Rook and Raven Gallery, London
 2015   Good Figures, Mall Galleries, London, Jerwood Gridshell Space, Weald and Downland Open Air Museum
 2014   Jerwood Drawing Prize 1994-2014: Artist as Selector, Jerwood Gallery, Hastings
 2012/13  Encounter: The Royal Academy in the Middle East, Doha
 2012   Encounter: The Royal Academy in Asia, Institute of Contemporary Arts, Singapore
 2004   The Jerwood Drawing Prize, Jerwood Space, London
 1993   Contemporary Art at the Courtauld, Courtauld Institute of Art, London
 1992   The New Patrons: Twentieth Century Art from Corporate Collections, Christie's, London
 1992   Myth, Dream and Fable, Angel Row Gallery, Nottingham
 1992   Innocence and Experience, South Bank Centre, London, Manchester Art Gallery, Hull and Glasgow
 1988   The New British Painting, Contemporary Arts Center, Cincinnati; Chicago Public Library Cultural Center; Haggerty Museum, Milwaukee; South-eastern Center for Contemporary Art, Winston-Salem; Grand Rapids Art Museum, Michigan
 1986   John Moores, Walker Art Gallery, Liverpool
 1985   Hand Signals, Ikon Gallery, Birmingham
 1984   The Image as Catalyst, Ashmolean Museum, Oxford
 1982, 1983, 1987    Whitechapel Open, Whitechapel Art Gallery, London
 1980   Women's Images of Men, Institute of Contemporary Art, London
 1974-76    New Contemporaries, Camden Arts Centre, London

Selected public collections 

Arts Council Collection
Government Art Collection, UK
Birmingham Museum & Art Gallery
Bristol Museum & Art Gallery
British Museum, London
Dallas Museum of Art, USA
Imperial College, London
Kunsthalle, Nuremberg, Germany
Manchester Art Gallery
MIMA, Middlesbrough
National Portrait Gallery, London
New Hall Art Collection, Murray Edwards College, University of Cambridge
Newport Museum and Art Gallery, Wales
The Open University
Pallant House Gallery, Chichester
Royal Academy of Arts, London
The Royal Collection Trust
Royal College of Art, London
Southampton University Hospital NHS Trust
Swindon Museum and Art Gallery
The Towner Art Gallery, Eastbourne
Victoria & Albert Museum, London
University of Warwick Art Collection
Lewis Walpole Library, Yale University, Connecticut, USA
Whitworth Art Gallery, Manchester
Wolverhampton Art Gallery

Awards and honours 

 2018: Glyndebourne Opera Invited Artist
 2009 & 2017: Co-ordinator and curator, Royal Academy of Arts Summer Exhibition
 2016: Appointed Officer of the Order of the British Empire (OBE) for services to the Arts and Arts Education
 2016: Made Honorary Fellow, Murray Edwards College, University of Cambridge
 2013: Made Honorary Doctor of Arts, Southampton Solent University
 2011: Made Honorary Fellow, Royal College of Art, London
 2011: Elected Keeper of the Royal Academy of Arts, first woman elected to the post since its foundation in 1768
 2010, 2013:  Artist in Residence, Alayrac, Tarn France
 2008-09: Artist in Residence, Lewisham College, London
 2006: Made Fellow of the Royal College of Art
 2002: Made Honorary Member, Royal Society of Painter-Printmakers
 2001: Elected Royal Academician
 1999: Arts & Humanities Research Council Award for ceramics
 1998-99: Artist in Residence Dulwich Picture Gallery, London
 1992: Staircase project Institute of Contemporary Art, London
 1982: Purchase Prize, Nuremberg Drawing Triennial

Publications 

 Under the Same Moon by Anna McNay, Letitia Gallery, Beirut, 2018
 Eileen Cooper: A Woman's Skin by Meredith M Hale and Philip Lindley, Wolfson College, University of Cambridge, 2017 
 Eileen Cooper: Till the Morning Comes by Michèle Roberts, The Fine Art Society, London, 2017 
 Eileen Cooper: Between the Lines by Martin Gayford, Royal Academy of Arts, 2015 
 Hide and Seek: Work on Paper 1977-2014 by Anna McNay, Royal Academy of Arts, 2015
 The New British Painting by Edward Lucie-Smith, Carolyn Cohen and Judith Higgins, Phaidon, Oxford, 1988 
 Contemporary Women Artists by Sister Wendy Beckett, Oxford, 1988 
 Trans Avant Garde International: New Painting in Britain by Achille Bonito Oliva, Milan, 1982

Television and broadcast 

 In the Studio film by Charlie Paul, 2015
 Art School, Smart School, BBC Radio 4 documentary, produced by Just Radio Ltd, 20 November 2014
 Women Artists interview with Emma Jane Kirby for ‘PM’, BBC Radio 4, 28 August 2014
 What I See Project, film, 2013
 A Story of Eileen Cooper, Artist and Keeper of the Royal Academy’, [www.ladieswhoimpress.com Ladieswholmpress], 17 October 2013
 Woman's Hour, BBC Radio 4, 2012
 Art School Education interview by Alexander Massouras for Tate Library & Archive, 16 September 2010
 Inside Art documentary series, Channel 4, 1994 (BAFTA nominated)
 The Art documentary, BBC Education, 1993

References

External links 
Official website

1953 births
Living people
20th-century British printmakers
21st-century British printmakers
20th-century English women artists
21st-century English women artists
Alumni of Goldsmiths, University of London
Alumni of the Royal College of Art
British contemporary painters
English printmakers
English women painters
Officers of the Order of the British Empire
People from Glossop
Royal Academicians
Women printmakers